Middle atmosphere is a collective term sometimes used to refer to various layers of the atmosphere of the Earth and corresponding regions of the atmospheres of other planets, and includes: